Poppendorf is a municipality  in the Rostock district, in Mecklenburg-Vorpommern, Germany.

Geography 
The municipality of Poppendorf lies some 15 kilometres from the city of Rostock and the Baltic Sea coast in northern Germany . The gently rolling countryside is drained by the stream of the Peezer Bach in the direction of the bay of Breitling. East of Poppendorf there is an extensive forest that is designated as a  protected area.

References